The Swan Coastal Plain in Western Australia is the geographic feature which contains the Swan River as it travels west to the Indian Ocean. The coastal plain continues well beyond the boundaries of the Swan River and its tributaries, as a geological and biological zone, one of Western Australia's Interim Biogeographic Regionalisation for Australia (IBRA) regions. It is also one of the distinct physiographic provinces of the larger West Australian Shield division.

Location and description
The coastal plain is a  strip on the Indian Ocean coast directly west of the Darling Scarp uplands running from Cape Naturaliste in the south to north of the city of Perth. The plain mainly consists of fairly infertile sandy soil along with coastal sand dunes, river estuaries, and a number of wetlands kept back from the sea by the dunes. A number of rivers cross the plain from east to west from the Darling Scarp towards the sea, including the Swan and its main tributary, the Canning.

The sediments of the Perth Basin are Tertiary and Quaternary in age immediately below Perth and include coquina, travertine, and sandy limestones with abundant shelly material. Perth is sited on a set of sand dunes formed during the Pliocene-Pleistocene during the last ice age. Offshore, the sand dune system and surficial deposits transition into a system of partly eroded limestones and sandy limestones. These form a series of drowned cuestas which today form submerged reefs.

Because of the steepness and orientation of the Darling Scarp, watercourses run off the scarp in a westerly direction. On reaching the Swan Coastal Plain, they encounter two obstacles: firstly, the high permeability of the soil results in the loss of much water. Much flow is lost, and some watercourses simply cease to flow, for example, Wungong Brook, Cardup Brook, and Manjedal Brook. Secondly, the sequence of north-to-south-oriented dunes create obstacles to further westerly flow. Many watercourses turn at right angles and flow south or north along the dune swales, and in some cases this allows multiple watercourses to coalesce.

Coastal dunes and Wanneroo wetlands
The dune topology also results in extensive north-to-south-oriented chains of wetlands, again located in the swales. For example, the chain of lakes north of Perth includes lakes of the Wanneroo wetlands including – Lake Pinjar, Jandabup Lake and Gnangara Lake. The large bodies of water in the estuary of the Swan River, Perth Water and Melville Water are also located in dune swales.

Geology
The Swan coastal plain is characterised by a series of sand dune systems, the Quindalup dunes, the Spearwood dunes, and the Bassendean dunes, which run from west to east (in increasing age) from the coastline to the major faults which form the eastern boundary of the plain. The plain is bounded to the east by the Darling Scarp, to the north by a subsidiary fault running north-west from Bullsbrook, and to the south by the Collie-Naturaliste Scarp. 
The Pinjarra plain lies between the Bassendean dunes and the eastern scarps. Early work on all three dune systems considered them to have been formed at differing times by the deposition of sands carried by wind (aeolian and/or by river processes (fluviatile).
More recently, later authors have argued that these sandplains are mostly the product of in situ weathering.

The carbonate material of all three dune systems has been completely leached, leaving dunes which consist solely of quartz sand. Within the Spearwood dunes, the yellow or grey sand may be several metres thick.

The dune systems have been much studied, as the water retained within them supplies much of Perth's water needs. (See Gnangara Mound).

Climate
In the southwest of Australia, the Nyoongar seasonal calendar includes six different seasons in a yearly cycle. 
These are Birak, Bunuru, Djeran, Makuru, Djilba and Kambarang. Each of the six seasons represents and explains the seasonal changes we see annually. The flowering of many different plants, the hibernation of reptiles and the moulting of swans are all helpful indicators that the seasons are changing.

The Nyoongar seasons can be long or short and are indicated by what is happening and changing around us rather than by dates on a calendar. Aligning Nyoongar seasons with Western calendar months can provide an overview of a typical year.

This six season calendar is extremely important to Nyoongar people, as it is a guide to what nature is doing at every stage of the year, as well as understanding respect for the land in relation to plant and animal fertility cycles and land and animal preservation.

The south west region of Western Australia was one of the first places on earth to experience the effects of human induced climate change, namely a significant decline in annual rainfall. 
The drying climate is expected to continue and exacerbate bushfires. 
The summer of 2021/22 has been the hottest on record, with many consecutive days over 40 degrees Celsius.

Ecology
The Swan Coastal Plain is a specific botanical province.

Flora
Southwestern Australia is very rich in flora, with an estimated 8,000 species, a quarter of which can be found on this coastal strip. The traditional flora of the dunes and the fairly infertile plain was dense shrubby kwongan heathland adapted to the poor soils, dry summers, and regular fires. Kwongan vegetation contains a large number of endemic plant species, especially shrubs and wildflowers, including yellow flame and toothbrush grevilleas, fan-flowers, and cockies' tongues. The heath is scattered with woodland of Banksia and other trees including the red-blossomed quandong (desert peach) and firewood banksia. Going further inland, especially in river valleys where the soil is better, eucalyptus woodlands including tuart (Eucalyptus gomphocephala) occur. The wetlands meanwhile have been particularly important ecologically, supporting a rich habitat of many plant varieties.

The Swan Coastal Plain is a particularly important centre for certain types of plants, including Banksia, but also Caladenia orchids and Leucopogon shrubs, indeed some genera, such as the Dryandra series of Banksia and the Synaphea flowers are found nowhere else in the world. Other flora of the plain includes a type of mistletoe called the Christmas tree.

Fauna
The coastal plains are home to a number of marsupials from the large western grey kangaroo to the very small southwestern pygmy possum and mouse-like honey possum. Remnant populations of some marsupials are found on offshore islands including the Tammar wallaby and the quokka, the latter particularly on Rottnest Island. The coastal plains skink, discovered in 2012, is endemic to sand dunes in the area, and is threatened by residential development.

Threats and preservation
Much of the plain has been cleared for agriculture and urban development, especially in and around Perth, where the heath has been almost entirely cleared as far as the Darling Scarp and the city is spreading up and down the coast. Although some areas are protected, clearance is going on while the plant disease Phytophthora dieback and changes to traditional fire regimens affect the heathland vegetation including the Banksia trees. Protected areas include Kings Park, Beeliar Wetlands, Star Swamp, Hepburn Heights Bushland, Canning River Regional Park, Bold Park, Whiteman Park, Kensington Bushland and Thomsons Lake.

History
Traditionally, this area was under the care and control of the Yued, Whadjuk, Binjareb, and Wardandi Noongar peoples, whose hunter-gathering firestick farming practices maintained the climax vegetations old growth forests observed at the time of first contact. At this time, the kwongan heathland was much more widespread along the coast.

In the 1830s, it was originally named Great Plain of Quartania or Plain of Quartania by James Stirling, the first governor of Western Australia, but those terms have fallen into disuse.

European settlement led to many of the wetlands areas being drained for land reclamation to take advantage of the fertile soil for farming enterprises, and for expansion of parks and recreation areas. The city of Perth sits on an area of reclaimed wetlands.  Between 49% (Riggert, 1966) and 80% (Godfrey, 1989) of the wetlands on the coastal plain is thought to have been drained, filled, or cleared since 1832. Lake Monger and Herdsman Lake are the last two major wetlands remaining in close proximity to the city.

Lake Monger with Georgiana Lake and Lake Sutherland (both near Mitchell Freeway, near Sutherland and Newcastle streets) and Herdsman Lake made up what was known as "The Great Lakes District". Other lakes and swamps in the immediate northern vicinity of the early Perth township were Lake Kingsford (site of the current Perth railway station), Lake Irwin (Perth Entertainment Centre) and further north were Stone's Lake (Perth Oval), Lake Poullet (First Swamp, part of what is now Birdwood Square), Lake Thomson (Mews Swamp, between Lake, Brisbane, and Beaufort Streets) and Lake Henderson (parts of what is now Robertson Park and Dorrien Gardens). Further north still lay Second Swamp (Bulwer Street, east of Lake Street), Third Swamp (Hyde Park), and Three Island Lake and Smith's Lake (now Charles Veryard Reserve). Many of these lakes formed a natural interconnected drainage system which found its way into the Swan River at East Perth through Claise Brook. In 1833, water draining from Lakes Kingsford, Irwin, Sutherland, and Henderson was used to drive a water-driven mill located in Mill Street.

See also
Islands of Perth, Western Australia

References

Further reading
Bekle, H. (1981) The wetlands lost: Drainage of the Perth lake systems. Western Geographer.
 Aborigines settle the Swan Coastal Plain : geological clues. 2003.
 in pp. 29–34	Glover, John. Geological journeys : from artefacts to zircon (edited by Jenny Bevan). Perth, W.A. : Geological Society of Australia (Western Australian Division), 2003. 
Godfrey, N. (1989) The value of wetlands. In: Wetlands in crisis. What can Local Government do? (Ed. Anon), pp. 4–12. Environmental Protection Agency, Western Australia.
Miller, C. (1976) Old Battleground. Living Today (Western Australia), 29 January, 32–33.
Middle, G.J. (1988) A method to evaluate conservational and social value of lentic wetlands on the Swan Coastal Plain. Honours thesis, Murdoch University, Western Australia.
Riggert, T.L. (1966) A study of the wetlands of the Swan Coastal Plain. Department of Fisheries and Fauna, Western Australia.
Stannage, C.T. (1979) The People of Perth, Perth City Council.

External links
 
Maps: Australia's bioregions IBRA 5.1
 http://www.environment.gov.au/parks/nrs/science/bioregion-framework/ibra/index.html

IBRA 6.1 Explorer
 http://www.environment.gov.au/metadataexplorer/explorer.jsp
– an online version of Thackway and Cresswell

 
IBRA regions
Mediterranean forests, woodlands, and scrub in Australia
Physiographic provinces
Plains of Australia
Southwest Australia